A sedan or saloon (British English) is a passenger car in a three-box configuration with separate compartments for an engine, passengers, and cargo.

The first recorded use of the word "sedan" in reference to an automobile body occurred in 1912. The name derives from the 17th-century litter known as a sedan chair, a one-person enclosed box with windows and carried by porters.

Variations of the sedan style include the close-coupled sedan, club sedan, convertible sedan, fastback sedan, hardtop sedan, notchback sedan, and sedanet/sedanette.

Definition

A sedan is a car with a closed body (i.e. a fixed metal roof) with the engine, passengers, and cargo in separate compartments. This broad definition does not differentiate sedans from various other car body styles, but in practice, the typical characteristics of sedans are:
 a B-pillar (between the front and rear windows) that supports the roof
 two rows of seats
 a three-box design with the engine at the front and the cargo area at the rear
 a less steeply sloping roofline than a coupé, which results in increased headroom for rear passengers and a less sporting appearance.
 a rear interior volume of at least 

It is sometimes suggested that sedans must have four doors (to provide a simple distinction between sedans and two-door coupés). However, several sources state that a sedan can have two or four doors. In addition, terms such as sedan and coupé have been more loosely interpreted by car manufacturers since 2010.

When a manufacturer produces two-door sedan and four-door sedan versions of the same model, the shape and position of the greenhouse on both versions may be identical, with only the B-pillar positioned further back to accommodate the longer doors on the two-door versions.

Etymology 

A sedan chair, a sophisticated litter, was an enclosed box with windows used to transport one seated person. Porters at the front and rear carried the chair with horizontal poles. Litters date back to long before ancient Egypt, India and China. Sedan chairs were developed in the 1630s. Etymologists suggest the name of the chair very probably came through varieties of Italian from the Latin sedere, meaning "to sit".

 The first recorded use of sedan for an automobile body occurred in 1912 when the Studebaker Four and Studebaker Six models were marketed as sedans.

There were fully enclosed automobile bodies before 1912. Long before that time the same fully enclosed but horse-drawn carriages were known as a "brougham" in the United Kingdom, "berline" in France, and "berlina" in Italy (the latter two have become the terms for sedans in these countries).

It is sometimes stated that the 1899 Renault Voiturette Type B (a 2-seat car with an extra external seat for a footman/mechanic) was the first sedan, since it is the first known car to be produced with a roof. A one of instance of a similar coach work is also known in a 1900 De Dion-Bouton Type D.

However, a sedan is typically considered to be a fixed roof car with at least 4 seats. Based on this definition, the earliest sedan was the 1911 Speedwell, which was manufactured in the United States.

International terminology
In American English, Latin American Spanish, and Brazilian Portuguese, the term sedan is used (accented as sedán in Spanish).

In British English, a car of this configuration is called a saloon. Hatchback sedans are known simply as hatchbacks (not hatchback saloons); long-wheelbase luxury saloons with a division between the driver and passengers are limousines. An equivalent term for Sports sedan in the United Kingdom is "super saloon".

In Australia and New Zealand sedan is now predominantly used, they were previously simply cars. In the 21st century, saloon is still found in the long-established names of particular motor races.

In other languages, sedans are known as berline (French), berlina (European Spanish, European Portuguese, Romanian, and Italian) though they may include hatchbacks. These names, like the sedan, all come from forms of passenger transport used before the advent of automobiles. In German, a sedan is called Limousine and a limousine is a Stretch-Limousine.

In the United States, two-door sedan models were marketed as "Tudor" in the Ford Model A (1927–1931) series. Automakers use different terms to differentiate their products and for Ford's sedan body styles "the tudor (2-door) and fordor (4-door) were marketing terms designed to stick in the minds of the public." Ford continued to use the Tudor name for 5-window coupes, 2-door convertibles, and roadsters since all had two doors. 

The Tudor name was also used to describe the Škoda 1101/1102 introduced in 1946. The name was popularized by the public for a two-door model and was then applied by the automaker to the entire line that included a four-door sedan and station wagon versions.

Standard styles

Notchback sedans

In the United States, notchback sedan distinguishes models with a horizontal trunk lid. The term is generally only referred to in marketing when it is necessary to distinguish between two sedan body styles (e.g. notchback and fastback) of the same model range.

Liftback sedans 

Several sedans have a fastback profile, but instead of a trunk lid, the entire back of the vehicle lifts up (using a liftgate or hatch). Examples include the Peugeot 309, Škoda Octavia, Hyundai Elantra XD, Chevrolet Malibu Maxx, BMW 4 Series Grand Coupe, Audi A5 Sportback, and Tesla Model S.

The names "hatchback" and "sedan" are often used to differentiate between body styles of the same model. Therefore the term "hatchback sedan" is not often used, to avoid confusion.

Fastback sedans

There have been many sedans with a fastback style.

Hardtop sedans

Hardtop sedans were a popular body style in the United States from the 1950s to the 1970s. Hardtops are manufactured without a B-pillar leaving uninterrupted open space or, when closed, glass along the side of the car. The top was intended to look like a convertible's top but it was fixed and made of hard material that did not fold.

All manufacturers in the United States from the early 1950s into the 1970s provided at least a 2-door hardtop model in their range and a 4-door hardtop as well. The lack of side-bracing demanded a particularly strong and heavy chassis frame to combat unavoidable flexing. The pillarless design was also available in four-door models using unibody construction. For example, Chrysler moved to unibody designs for most of its models in 1960 and American Motors Corporation (AMC) offered four-door sedans, as well a four-door station wagon from 1958 until 1960 in the Rambler and Ambassador series.

In 1973 the US government passed Federal Motor Vehicle Safety Standard 216 creating a standard roof strength test to measure the integrity of roof structure in motor vehicles to come into effect some years later. Production of hardtop sedan body style ended with the 1978 Chrysler Newport. For a time roofs were covered with vinyl and B-pillars were minimized by using styling methods like matt black finishes. Stylists and engineers soon developed more subtle solutions.

Mid-20th century variations

Close-coupled sedans
A close-coupled sedan is a body style produced in the United States during the 1920s and 1930s. Their two-box boxy styling made these sedans more like crossover vehicles than traditional three-box sedans. Like other close-coupled body styles, the rear seats are located further forward than a regular sedan. This reduced the length of the body, so close-coupled sedans (also known as town sedans) were the shortest of the sedan models offered.

Models of close-coupled sedans include the Chrysler Imperial, Duesenberg Model A and Packard 745

Coach sedans

A two-door sedan for four or five passengers but with less room for passengers than a standard sedan. A Coach body has no external trunk for luggage. Haajanen notes it can be difficult to tell the difference between a Club and a Brougham and a Coach body as if manufacturers were more concerned with marketing their product than adhering to strict body style definitions.

Close-coupled saloons
Close-coupled saloons originated as four-door thoroughbred sporting horse-drawn carriages with little room for the feet of rear passengers.

In automotive use, manufacturers in the United Kingdom used the term for the development of the chummy body where passengers were forced to be friendly because they were tightly packed. They provided weather protection for extra passengers in what would otherwise be a two-seater car. Two-door versions would be described in the US and France as coach bodies. A postwar example is the Rover 3 Litre Coupé.

Club sedans

Produced in the United States from the mid-1920s to the mid-1950s, the name club sedan was used for highly appointed models using the sedan chassis. Some people describe a club sedan as a two-door vehicle with a body style otherwise identical to the sedan models in the range. Others describe a club sedan as having either two or four doors and a shorter roof (and therefore less interior space) than the other sedan models in the range.

The term "club sedan" originates from the club carriage (e.g. the lounge or parlour carriage) in a railroad train.

Sedanets
From the 1910s to the 1950s, several United States manufacturers have named models either Sedanet or Sedanette. The term originated as a smaller version of the sedan, however it has also been used for convertibles and fastback coupes.

Models which have been called Sedanet or Sedanette include: 1917 Dort Sedanet, King, 1919 Lexington, 1930s Cadillac Fleetwood Sedanette, 1949 Cadillac Series 62 Sedanette, 1942-1951 Buick Super Sedanet and 1956 Studebaker.

See also

 Car classification
 Limousine
 Sports sedan

References

 
Car body styles
Car classifications